M. horridus may refer to:
 Mantidactylus horridus, a frog species endemic to Madagascar
 Marah horridus, the Sierra manroot, a flowering plant species endemic to California
 Moloch horridus, the thorny devil, a lizard species found in Australia

See also
 Horridus (disambiguation)